Adrian Flynn is a former professional rugby league footballer who played in the 1990s and 2000s.

Playing career

Club career
Adrian Flynn made his début for Wakefield Trinity in October 1992 and played his last match for there during the 1994–95 season. He was transferred to the Castleford Tigers on 25 July 1995 and from Castleford to the Dewsbury Rams. He was transferred from Dewsbury to the Featherstone Rovers, making his début there on Sunday 19 January 2003, and played his last match for them during the 2003 season.

Genealogical information
Adrian Flynn is the older brother of the rugby league footballer, Wayne Flynn.

References

External links
Oldham dent Keighley play-off hopes
Dewsbury edged home 25-10 against Rochdale at Ram Stadium, despite the visitors taking an early 10-2 lead
Whitehaven were forced to battle hard to earn a 16-8 home win over Dewsbury despite David Seeds' first-half brace of tries
Cash-strapped Swinton's woes continued with a 75-12 thrashing at the hands of Dewsbury
Dewsbury ran in nine tries as they condemned bottom-placed Wasps to a 48-6 hammering at Ram Stadium
Dewsbury came from behind to beat Sheffield 30-12 at the Rams Stadium
Featherstone were in the points as they ran out 44-18 winners over Doncaster
Centurions reach semis
Adrian Flynn Memory Box Search at archive.castigersheritage.com

1974 births
Living people
Batley Bulldogs players
Castleford Tigers players
Dewsbury Rams players
English rugby league players
Featherstone Rovers players
Place of birth missing (living people)
Rugby league wingers
Wakefield Trinity players